Boleite is a complex halide mineral with formula:  KPb26Ag9Cu24(OH)48Cl62. It was first described in 1891 as an oxychloride mineral. It is an isometric mineral which forms in deep-blue cubes. There are numerous minerals related to boleite, such as pseudoboleite, cumengite, and diaboleite, and these all have the same complex crystal structure. They all contain bright-blue cubic forms and are formed in altered zones of lead and copper deposits, produced during the reaction of chloride bearing solutions with primary sulfide minerals.

Physical properties
The external property of a boleite crystal structure indicates its cubic structure. It is classified under the isometric crystal class. Boleite has a perfect cleavage in the [001] direction, and has a very dark glossy blue color with a light greenish-blue color streak. Twinning is best shown in this mineral by notches along the interpenetrated angles, which results in a crystal habit of pseudocubic penetration twinning along three different angles perpendicular to one another. Boleite has cubes over half an inch on each side, which consist of pseudo-octahedral tetragonal dipyramids.

Geologic occurrence

Boleite was first collected as a very minor ore of silver, copper and lead at Boleo, Mexico. Boleite was named after its place of discovery, El Boleo mine, on the Baja Peninsula, near Santa Rosalia, Mexico.

Minerals associated with boleite include pseudoboleite, cumengeite, atacamite, anglesite, cerussite, phosgenite and gypsum at the type locality in Boleo, Mexico. In the Mammoth-St. Anthony mine of Arizona associated minerals include pseudoboleite, anglesite, cerussite, atacamite, paratacamite, leadhillite, paralaurionite, caledonite, phosgenite, matlockite and  bideauxite.

References

External links

 	
Parker, Robert L. (1981). Rocks and Mineral Deposits. W.H. Freeman and Company. San Francisco. 343–422.
Pirsson, Louis V. (1964). Rocks and Rock Minerals. John Wiley & Sons, Inc. New York, London. 34-56
Williams, Peter A., Thomas, John H., Humphries, Alun, Samad, Abdul F. (1981). “Chemical Studies on the Stabilities of Boleite and Pseudoboleite”. Mineralogical Magazine v.44: 101-104 3
link to cryptohalite

Lead minerals
Potassium minerals
Silver minerals
Copper minerals
Halide minerals
Cubic minerals
Minerals in space group 221